Chairmen of the Board is an American-Canadian, Detroit, Michigan-based soul music group, who saw their greatest commercial success in the 1970s.

Recording career
General Johnson (1941–2010) had a hit as the lead singer of The Showmen in the early 1960s, with the New Orleans rock and roll anthem "It Will Stand" and Carolina Beach classic "39-21-40 Shape".

When Holland/Dozier/Holland left Motown in 1967 to establish their own Invictus/Hot Wax group of record labels, they teamed Johnson up with Eddie Custis, Danny Woods and Canadian born Harrison Kennedy as the new company's flagship act, under the appropriate name "Chairmen of the Board". Custis left the group after their second album.

Although they all had a turn at lead vocals, it was Johnson's quirky hiccup-laden style and his songwriting that became increasingly showcased, with the group selling a million plus copies of their single, "Give Me Just a Little More Time". The disc was released in December 1969, reached number three on the US Billboard Hot 100, with one million sales confirmed in May 1970, when the group were presented with a gold record by the R.I.A.A. Chairmen of the Board also charted with "(You've Got Me) Dangling on a String", "Everything's Tuesday", "Pay to the Piper", "Finders Keepers" and (in the UK) "Working on a Building of Love" and "Elmo James". They also recorded the original version of "Patches", co-written by Johnson, which became a 1970 hit for Clarence Carter. The song received a Grammy Award in 1971.

Kennedy, Woods and Johnson all went on to record solo albums, whilst Johnson wrote and produced (with Greg Perry) for other Invictus/Hot Wax acts, notably Honey Cone. Kennedy having left, Johnson and Woods toured the UK in 1976 with six musicians as Chairmen of the Board. The final night of the tour was at Middleton Civic Hall on March 11, 1976. The act was broken up immediately afterwards, Johnson having signed for Arista Records as a solo artist.

In 1978, Johnson reformed the Chairmen of the Board along with Danny Woods and Ken Knox. In 1980, the new Chairmen founded Surfside Records and began recording beach music. The group remain popular on the beach scene, and Surfside Records still exists as an independent record label based in Charlotte, North Carolina.  
 
The Chairmen of the Board  (General Johnson, Danny Woods and Ken Knox) were inducted into the North Carolina Music Hall of Fame in 1999.

General Johnson continued to perform with Woods and Knox as the "Chairmen of the Board" until his death from lung cancer in 2010.

In 2012, Chairmen of the Board released a single, "You", which was written and produced by Knox. In 2013, former member Harrison Kennedy was nominated for a Blues Music Award in the "Acoustic Artist" category.

Danny Woods (born Daniel Woods, Jr. on March 27, 1942 in Atlanta, Georgia) died on January 12, 2018, at the age of 75.

In 2021, Chairmen of the Board partnered with producer Wheeler del Torro to bring a new, modern edge to their trademark sound. Del Torro assembled group of remixers, including Severino Panzetta (Horse Meat Disco, Beating Cells) and Doug Gomez to remix their newest single, "Reach Out".

Discography

Albums

Singles

Bibliography
 The Illustrated Encyclopaedia of Black Music - Salamandar Books -

References

External links

General Johnson & The Chairmen Of The Board interview by Pete Lewis, 'Blues & Soul' August 1987 (reprinted December 2010)

Musical groups from Detroit
Northern soul musicians
American soul musical groups
1967 establishments in Michigan